The year 1942 in television involved some significant events.
Below is a list of television-related events during 1942.



Events
February 26 — WRGB Signs on in Albany New York.
April 1 – The U.S. War Production Board halts the manufacture of television and radio equipment for consumer use. The ban is lifted October 1, 1945.
April 13 – The Federal Communications Commission minimum programming time required of U.S. television stations is reduced from 15 to 4 hours a week during the war.

Debuts  
February 23 - Air Raid Warden’s Basic Course debuts on NBC (1942-43)

February 27 - World This Week, an early news program hosted by Linton Wells, debuts on CBS (1942)

March 6 - America At War debuts on CBS (1942)

Television shows

Programs ending during 1942

Births
January 3 – John Thaw, English actor (Inspector Morse) (died 2002)
January 5 – Charlie Rose, journalist
January 8
Yvette Mimieux, actress (died 2022)
Stephen Hawking, scientist (died 2018)
January 10 – Walter Hill, director
January 11 – Joel Zwick, director
January 17 – Muhammad Ali, boxer (died 2016)
January 21 – Edwin Starr, singer (died 2003)
January 23 - Brian Croucher, actor
January 27 - John Witherspoon, actor and comedian (Wayans Brothers) (died 2019)
January 30 - Heidi Brühl, actress
February 1 
Terry Jones, Welsh comedic actor and writer (Monty Python's Flying Circus) (died 2020)
Bibi Besch, actress (died 1996)
February 12 – George Schenck, screenwriter
February 13 – Peter Tork, musician and actor (The Monkees) (died 2019)
February 14 – Michael Bloomberg, namesake of Bloomberg TV
February 16 – Patricia Maynard, actress
February 17 – Dieter Laser, actor (died 2020)
February 22 – Geoffrey Scott, actor (Dynasty) (died 2021)
February 23 – Joop van den Ende, Dutch theatrical producer
February 25 – Karen Grassle, actress (Little House on the Prairie)
February 28 – Frank Bonner, actor and director (WKRP in Cincinnati) (died 2021)
March 3 – David Jacobs, gymnast
March 4 – Lynn Sherr, broadcast journalist
March 6 – Ben Murphy, actor (Alias Smith and Jones)
March 14 - Nickolas Davatzes, television executive (died 2021)
March 25 - Aretha Franklin, singer (died 2018)
March 29 – Scott Wilson, American actor (died 2018)
March 31 – Michael Savage, American host
April 3 
Marsha Mason, actress and director
Wayne Newton, actor and singer
April 7 – Gabrielle Beaumont, director
April 17 – David Bradley, actor
April 23 
Sandra Dee, actress (died 2005)
Sheila Gish, actress (died 2005)
April 24 – Barbra Streisand, singer
April 26 – Bobby Rydell, singer
May 1 – Thomas Del Ruth, American cinematographer
May 3 – Dave Marash, American television journalist
May 5 – Marc Alaimo, American television actor
May 6 – David Friesen, American jazz bassist
May 12 – Marya Carter, actress
May 20 
David Proval, actor (The Sopranos)
Nancy Fleming, American beauty pageant titleholder
May 22 – Barbara Parkins, actress (Peyton Place)
May 23 – Alex Henteloff, actor (Barney Miller)
May 27 – Sue Simmons, retired news anchor
May 29 – Kevin Conway, actor (died 2020)
June 16 – Suzan Farmer, actress (died 2017)
June 18
Paul McCartney, English singer-songwriter (The Beatles)
Nick Tate, Australian actor (Space: 1999)
Roger Ebert, American film critic, film historian, journalist, screenwriter, and author (died 2013)
June 19 – Ned Schmidtke, actor
June 24 – Michele Lee, actress, dancer and singer (Knots Landing)
July 6 – Judith Barcroft, actress (Another World)
July 7 – Chris Stamp, British music producer
July 9 – Richard Roundtree, actor
July 13 – Harrison Ford, actor
July 22 – Toyohiro Akiyama, TV journalist
July 23 – Madeline Bell, singer
July 29 – Tony Sirico, actor (The Sopranos) (died 2022)
August 7 – Tobin Bell, actor
August 9 – David Steinberg, actor
August 18 – Judith Keppel, quiz show contestant
August 20 – Isaac Hayes, singer and actor (South Park) (died 2008)
August 28 – Peter Bartlett, actor (One Life to Live)
September 6 – Carol Wayne, actress (died 1985)
September 17 – Lupe Ontiveros, actress (died 2012)
September 20 – William F. Baker, broadcaster
September 21 – Tracy Reed, actress (died 2012)
September 23 – Carol Ann Abrams, American television and film producer (died 2012)
September 26 – Kent McCord, actor (Adam-12)
September 29 
Ian McShane, English actor (Lovejoy, Deadwood)
Donna Corcoran, actress
October 3 – Alan Rachins, actor (L.A. Law, Dharma & Greg)
October 6 – Britt Ekland, Swedish actress
October 7 – Joy Behar, American comedian
October 12 – Petronella Barker, actress
October 14 
Cyrus Yavneh, producer (died 2018)
Jim Hougan, producer
October 17 – Kelly Monteith, actor (died 2023)
October 20 – Earl Hindman, actor (Home Improvement) (died 2003)
October 21 – Judy Sheindlin, television personality, television producer, and author, and a former prosecutor and Manhattan family court judge
October 22 – Annette Funicello, actress and singer (The Mickey Mouse Club) (died 2013)
October 23 – Michael Crichton, author and filmmaker (died 2008)
October 29 – Bob Ross, television host (died 1995)
October 31 – David Ogden Stiers, actor (M*A*S*H) (died 2018)
November 1 – Marcia Wallace, actress and comedian (The Bob Newhart Show, The Simpsons) (died 2013)
November 2 – Stefanie Powers, actress (Hart to Hart)
November 9 – Tom Weiskopf, golfer
November 17 – Martin Scorsese, actor
November 18 
Linda Evans, actress (The Big Valley, Dynasty)
Susan Sullivan, actress (Falcon Crest)
November 19 – Calvin Klein, fashion designer
November 20 
Bob Einstein, actor (died 2019)
Joe Biden, politician (guest star on Parks and Recreation)
November 22 – Dick Stockton, American retired sportscaster
November 24 – Billy Connolly, actor
November 29 – John Grillo, actor
December 4 
Gemma Jones, actress
Al Hunt, reporter
December 6 – Chelsea Brown, actress (died 2017)
December 7 – Peter Tomarken, game show host (Press Your Luck) (died 2006)
December 9 – Dick Butkus, actor
December 14 – Jack Cafferty, former CNN commentator
December 23 – Brian McConnachie, actor
December 27 – Charmian Carr, actress (died 2016)
December 30 
Michael Nesmith, musician and actor (The Monkees) (died 2021)
Fred Weinberg, composer
Betty Aberlin, actress

Deaths
October – Bernard Natan, owner of Pathé and co-founder of France's first television company, Télévision-Baird-Natan, 56

References

 
TV